L.A. Weatherly, also known as Lee Weatherly and Titania Woods, is an American author. She was born in 1967 and grew up in Little Rock, Arkansas in the USA. She lives with her husband in The Scottish Borders, UK. She has written over fifty books for children and young adults, though is best known for her YA trilogy Angel. The first title in the series, "Angel", was published in 2010. The second, Angel Fire, came out in 2012; the final title in the series, Angel Fever, was published in 2013.

Weatherly also has written several novels for teenagers, including Child X, Missing Abby, and Soul Mates. 

Weatherly, under the pseudonym Titania Woods, has also written the notable series Glitterwings Academy for 5- to 8-year-olds. The collection contains 15 different, creative books in a sequence.

Publications

Children's literature 
 Glitterwings Academy (2008-2010)
 Pigwitchery (2008)
 The Scariest Monster in The World (2009)
 Pocket Cat Series (2010-2011)

Young Adult literature 
 Child X (June 2002)
 Missing Abby (2004)
 Breakfast at Sadie's (2006)
 Kat Got Your Tongue (2007) 
 Angel series
 Angel Burn (January 2010)
 Angel Fire (October 2011)
 Angel Fever (August 2013)
 Broken Series (2016-2017)

Non-fiction 
 Teach Yourself to Write a Blockbuster (2006)

References

External links

Official website
L.A. Weatherly at usborne.com/angel
L.A. Weatherly at goodreads.com

1967 births
Living people
21st-century American novelists
21st-century American women writers
American fantasy writers
American science fiction writers
American women novelists
American writers of young adult literature
Women science fiction and fantasy writers
Women writers of young adult literature
Writers from Little Rock, Arkansas